The Kherson uezd was one of the subdivisions of the Kherson Governorate of the Russian Empire. It was situated in the southeastern part of the governorate. Its administrative centre was Kherson.

Demographics
At the time of the Russian Empire Census of 1897, Khersonsky Uyezd had a population of 587,804. Of these, 55.1% spoke Ukrainian, 24.6% Russian, 11.9% Yiddish, 3.5% German, 2.1% Belarusian, 0.9% Polish, 0.8% Moldovan or Romanian, 0.6% Bulgarian, 0.2% Tatar, 0.1% Swedish and 0.1% Greek as their native language.

References

 
Uezds of Kherson Governorate
Kherson Governorate